George Goodfellow may refer to:
 George E. Goodfellow, American physician and naturalist
 George Goodfellow (cricketer), Australian cricketer